Lygodesmia, called skeletonplant, is a genus of North American flowering plants in the tribe Cichorieae within the family Asteraceae.

The name derives from the Greek lygos, a pliant twig, and desme, a bundle, because of the fascicled twiggy or rush-like stems of the plants.

 Species
 Lygodesmia aphylla - FL GA AL
 Lygodesmia arizonica - AZ NM CO UT 
 Lygodesmia dianthopsis - AZ UT NV ID
 Lygodesmia doloresensis - CO UT 
 Lygodesmia entrada -  UT 
 Lygodesmia grandiflora - AZ NM CO UT WY
 Lygodesmia juncea - widespread across western Canada + western United States
 Lygodesmia ramosissima - AZ TX Chihuahua, Durango, Sonora
 Lygodesmia texana - TX OK NM Coahuila, Nuevo León

References

External links

 USDA Plants Profile: Lygodesmia
 Southwest Colorado Wildflowers
 Florida Plant Atlas
 Natural Medicinal Herbs, Skeleton Weed, Lygodesmia juncea
 Ladybird Johnson Wildflower Center, University of Texas, Lygodesmia texana 
 Minnesota Wildflowers, Lygodesmia juncea (Skeletonweed)

Asteraceae genera
Flora of North America